Synovus Centre is an office building in Downtown Columbus, Georgia that serves as the headquarters of regional banking and financial services company Synovus. It was built at a cost of 18 million dollars in 2003 and has views of the Chattahoochee River.  The building is a condominium and contains 120,000 square feet (11,000 m2), and 5 floors. Synovus occupies the 5th floor, half of the 4th floor and the 2nd floor and parts of the 1st floor. The 3rd floor of the building is owned by Page, Scrantom, Sprouse, Tucker & Ford, P.C., the largest law firm in Columbus. A portion of the 4th floor of the building is leased to another local law firm, Pope, McGlamry, Kilpatrick & Morrison, LLP.

External links
Synovus Financial Corporation
New Georgia Encyclopedia Article on Synovus

Buildings and structures in Columbus, Georgia